The Cadiz Record is a weekly newspaper (published on Wednesdays) in Cadiz, Kentucky (Trigg County). It has fewer than 5,000 subscribers.

History
It started publishing December 31, 1880 as the Kentucky Telephone. By 1899, the paper had a circulation of 1,375 copies. 

In 1898, the newspaper was purchased by Henry R. Lawrence in partnership with George H. Pike. Later that year, there was a fire at the building. After purchasing new printing equipment, the name of the newspaper was changed to the Cadiz Record.

Under the direction of Lawrence, the newspaper was a democratic publication. For example, he used it as a platform to fight for justice in the Black Patch Tobacco Wars.

References

External links
 Web site for The Cadiz Record

Weekly newspapers published in the United States
Newspapers published in Kentucky
Newspapers established in 1880
Record